Time in Brunei Darussalam is given by Brunei Darussalam Time (BNT), which is UTC+08:00.  Brunei Darussalam 'standard time' does not currently observe daylight saving time (DST).

References

Brunei
Brunei